The Big Boss (lit. "The Big Brother from Tangshan"; originally titled Fists of Fury in America) is a 1971 Hong Kong action martial arts film produced by Raymond Chow and starring Bruce Lee in his first major film in a lead role. The film also stars Maria Yi, James Tien, Tony Liu, and Nora Miao. Originally written for Tien, the leading role was given to Lee instead when the film's original director, Ng Kar-seung, was replaced by Lo. The film was a critical success and excelled at the box office. Lee's strong performance overshadowed Tien, already a star in Hong Kong, and made Bruce Lee famous in Asia and eventually the world.

The film went on to gross nearly  worldwide (equivalent to approximately  adjusted for inflation), against a tight budget of $100,000, approximately  times its original investment. It was the highest-grossing Hong Kong film up until Lee's next film, Fist of Fury (1972).

Plot
Cheng Chao-an is a Chinese man from Tangshan, Hebei, who moves to Pak Chong, Thailand to live with his adopted family and to work in an ice factory. He meets his cousin Hsu Chien and Hsu's younger brother by accident when Hsu stands up to local street thugs who steal dumplings from his brother. Cheng refrains from getting involved despite being tempted to, as he swore to his mother to never participate in any fighting and wears a jade amulet around his neck as a reassurance of his pledge. Cheng begins his work at the ice factory. When an ice block is accidentally broken, a bag of white powdery drugs falls out. Two of Cheng's cousins pick up the bag and are told to see the manager later that night.

The factory is actually a front for a drug smuggling ring led by Hsiao Mi (a.k.a. the Big Boss). When Cheng's cousins refuse to join them, the manager sends his thugs to kill them and dispose of their bodies, thereby preserving the secret. Hsu Chien and Ah Pei, another one of Cheng's cousins, go to Hsiao Mi's Mansion to find out what happened to the two cousins. Hsu doubts Hsiao's claims that he doesn't know anything and threatens to go to the authorities. Hsiao sets his gang on the duo as a result, and after a brutal battle, they are both killed as well and their bodies hidden. When the Chinese workers at the ice factory learn that Hsu is missing as well, they refuse to work, and start a riot against the Thai management, who are joined by a group of hired thugs.

During the chaos, one of the thugs accidentally rips off and breaks Cheng's amulet. Enraged, Cheng jumps into the brawl and beats some of the thugs, causing them to flee. To reduce tensions, the ice factory manager makes Cheng a foreman, inviting him to a dinner that night. This later causes much unease for Cheng's family and friends, who believe that Cheng is growing arrogant and spending more time reveling in his new position than helping to look for their brothers. They grow to resent him, all except Chiao Mei, his sister, who stands up for him. Cheng gets drunk at the dinner party and is seduced by Sun Wu Man, a prostitute who attended the dinner. She later warns Cheng that his life is in danger and reveals that Hsiao Mi is running a drug trafficking operation. 

Immediately after Cheng leaves, Hsiao's son, Hsiao Chiun, sneaks in and kills Sun by throwing a knife at her heart from behind. Cheng breaks into the factory and first finds the drugs before discovering a hand, the head of Sun, and the head of Hsu Chien in the ice blocks. Cheng is surrounded by Hsiao Chiun and a group of his men. Cheng fights his way out, killing Hsiao Chiun and his gang in the process. He returns home to find that his remaining family members have been murdered, while Chiao Mei is missing. Mourning his loss by a river, Cheng vows to exact his revenge at all costs, even if he dies. To this end, Cheng returns to the town brothel and indulges in final pleasures with another Thai prostitute. Learning of the Boss' location, Cheng leaves the prostitute with the remainder of his money and departs, despite her attempts in convincing him to run away with her instead.

Cheng subsequently storms Hsiao Mi's mansion to fight him and his men. One of Hsiao Mi's disgruntled slaves frees Chiao Mei, who was being held hostage by Hsiao Mi in a cramped room used as a prison cell. Chiao Mei runs away to get help from the Thai police. Cheng finally kills Hsiao Mi after a fierce fight, by deflecting the knife Mi throws at him with his shoe. Once he knows that Chiao Mei is safe (as she came running along with the police division), he surrenders to the police when they arrive at the mansion, and is detained and taken to the police vehicle to leave the mansion.

Cast
Bruce Lee as Cheng Chao-an, a young man who, along with his uncle, travels from Guangdong, China to Pak Chong, Thailand to stay with his cousins. Before departing, he swore an oath to his mother to not get into any fights. This is made legitimate by Cheng wearing his mother's jade amulet necklace to serve as a reminder to that oath he swore.
Maria Yi as Chow Mei, a typical damsel in distress; Cheng's only female cousin
James Tien (a.k.a. Paul Tien) as Hsu Chien, a martial artist who commonly fights with the local gangs
Nora Miao as a local cold drinks vendor (guest star)
Lee Quinn as Ah Kun
Rhoma Irama as Xin Chang 
Han Ying-chieh as Hsiao Mi ("The Big Boss") owner of an ice factory which is really a front for his drug trafficking operation
Lau Wing as Hsiao Chiun, Hsiao Mi's son
Kam San as Cousin Ah Shan
Ricky Chik as Cousin Ah Chen (also assistant director)
Li Hua Sze as Cousin Ah Wong
Marilyn Bautista (a.k.a. Malarin Boonak) as Miss Sun Wu Man, a prostitute
Chan Chue as the ice factory manager (also assistant director)
Chom as the ice factory foreman
Billy Chan Wui-ngai as Cousin Ah Pei
Lam Ching-ying as Cousin Ah Yen 
Tu Chia-Cheng as Uncle Liu, Cheng's uncle (also unit manager) 
Peter Chan Lung as Hsiao Mi's henchman and gatekeeper

Background and conception
The four years following the cancellation of The Green Hornet was a difficult and frustrating time for Bruce Lee. In 1970, he was incapacitated for several months after damaging a sacral nerve in his lower back while weightlifting. Money became tight as roles in Hollywood proved hard to come by, and wife Linda had to work evenings at an answering service to help pay the bills. Bruce was still keen to develop film and TV projects in Hollywood, but Warner Bros. was reluctant to accept a TV script project he had developed (the plotline of which was similar to, but not the same as, Kung Fu), and production on The Silent Flute had to be suspended indefinitely after a three-week trip to India with James Coburn and Stirling Silliphant to scout locations for the movie proved unproductive. In light of these recent events, Coburn suggested to Bruce that he try his luck in the increasingly growing Hong Kong film industry."

In spring 1970, Bruce paid a visit to Hong Kong with his young son Brandon. Unbeknownst to Bruce, he had become famous there due to reruns of The Green Hornet on TV, and the enthusiastic reception he received took him by surprise. He was invited to appear on popular HKTVB chat show Enjoy Yourself Tonight, where he was interviewed and gave a board-breaking demonstration.

Encouraged by the interest in Hong Kong, Bruce asked his childhood friend Unicorn Chan to pass on his CV to Shaw Brothers, Hong Kong's largest film production company. They offered Bruce a long-term contract but only US$2,000 per film, which Bruce declined. Another offer appeared unexpectedly from Raymond Chow, a film producer who had in 1970 left Shaw Brothers to form a new company, Golden Harvest. Chow, aware of the rejected offer from Shaw Brothers, had been impressed by Bruce's interviews on Hong Kong television and radio, and also by his confidence during a long-distance phone call. During that phone call, Lee determined the best action movie playing in Hong Kong and assured Chow that he could do much better.

In June 1971, Chow sent one of his producers, Liu Liang-Hua (the wife of director Lo Wei) to Los Angeles to meet and negotiate with Bruce, who signed a contract to make two films for Golden Harvest for US$15,000 ($10,000 for The Big Boss and $5,000 on completion of a second film tentatively titled King of Chinese Boxers and which became Fist of Fury). This eased the Lees' financial worries and permitted Linda to quit her job.

With the contract signed, Chow hastily arranged a meeting with his Golden Harvest executives and an old friend called Ma Thien-Ek (Fatty Ma), a Thai businessman, film distributor and cinema owner. They knew that Shaw Brothers were making a Muay Thai boxing film in Thailand (Duel of Fists), and wanted to make their new film there, which would also help to keep costs down. Fatty Ma, an expert in Thai affairs, offered to help with locations and expenses.

Production

Writing
Veteran Chinese novelist and screenwriter Ni Kuang was commissioned to create a script based loosely on Cheng Chi-Yong, a prominent Chinese figure in Thai society in the early 20th century. Ni Kuang changed the name of the character to Cheng Chao-an, after Chao'an county in eastern China, the home of Cheng Chi-Yong's ancestors. He also developed the idea of Cheng being sent by his mother to live and work with fellow Chinese migrants in Thailand, after his father had been killed in a fight. She gave her son a jade necklace symbolising peace, protection and good fortune, as a reminder to avoid trouble.

It was not unusual in Hong Kong cinema for the director to amend the script during filming, and The Big Boss was no exception. When Lo Wei replaced the original director in late July 1971, he was unhappy with the script and re-wrote it, without Bruce's knowledge. Lo later recalled, "I wouldn't tell him I was re-writing the script for fear of affecting his morale. In my hotel room, he would often discuss the script with me which would leave me tongue-tied, so I would tell him I needed to rest, and as soon as he left I would be burning the midnight oil in order to get the script ready for the next day's filming."

Filming
Bruce Lee flew from Los Angeles to Bangkok via Hong Kong on 12 July 1971. Raymond Chow, concerned about renewed interest from Shaw Brothers, had wanted him to fly directly to Bangkok, but Bruce refused, stopping in Hong Kong briefly to greet a friend and make a few phone calls. Bruce stayed in Bangkok for five nights, and it was here that he met most of the cast and crew and also Raymond Chow for the first time. Filming commenced on 22 July in Pak Chong, a small town situated some 90 miles (150 km) northeast of Bangkok, on the northern edge of the Khao Yai National Park, Thailand's oldest reserve; it also serves as the gateway to the northeast (Isan) of Thailand from the Bangkok Metropolitan Region. Pak Chong would be Bruce's home for about four weeks, and he made no secret of his dislike for it in letters to wife Linda, describing it as a lawless, impoverished and undeveloped village. Due to the lack of fresh food, Bruce was losing weight due to a lack of proper diet, having to eat canned meat and supplement his diet with vitamins, which he had thankfully brought along. He occasionally lost his voice through trying to shout above the noise on set; mosquitoes and cockroaches were everywhere, and the tap water in the hotel was yellow. Bruce asked the hotel staff to put his mattress on the floor, as sleeping on the bed was uncomfortable due to his ongoing back problem. He also needed lots of rest after a fight scene.

When Bruce arrived in Pak Chong, rival film companies tried desperately to poach him away from Golden Harvest, including Shaw Brothers, with a new and improved offer. A film producer from Taiwan told Bruce to rip up his contract and promised to take care of any lawsuit. Bruce, a man of his word, had no intention of considering the offers, although it did add some extra tension on the film set.

Shooting did not go smoothly at first. After just a few days, the "uncertain" original director, Wu Chia Hsiang, was replaced by Lo Wei (the husband of associate producer Liu Liang-Hua). Bruce was initially sceptical of Lo, describing him in letters to Linda as a "fame lover" and "another so-so one with an almost unbearable air of superiority". Bruce badly cut his right hand while washing a thin glass, the wound requiring ten stitches and a large plaster, which is very noticeable throughout the movie, especially the scenes filmed at the Thamrongthai ice factory, the first filming location used in Pak Chong. Fatty Ma had a contact who knew the owner of the factory, and arranged for Golden Harvest to film there for a few days.

One night, filming of the big fight in the ice house had to be stopped for an hour as Bruce had lost a contact lens, and dozens of people were on their hands and knees looking for it amongst thousands of ice chips. Eventually Bruce found it himself, leading Lo Wei to wonder if he had it in his pocket all along, and was deliberately being disruptive.

Aside from the factory, other locations in Pak Chong used for filming include the Lam Ta Khong river (a tributary of the Mun River), and a local brothel (the Mitsumphun Hotel), which has since burnt down. The actual bedroom scenes however were filmed in a riverside bungalow owned by the nearby New Wan Chai Hotel (now the Rimtarninn), where the film crew stayed during filming, due to the bedrooms in the brothel being smelly and unhygienic. The prostitutes charged only fifteen Baht in Thai money per client, but the film crew paid them one to two hundred Baht each to appear as extras in the film.

Perhaps the most iconic location seen in the film is the titular big boss's mansion and gardens, which was a Buddhist temple situated on the main road called Wat Siri Samphan, built in 1963. Like the ice factory, it is still in Pak Chong today and remains largely unchanged, much to the delight of the dedicated fans who have made the pilgrimage to Thailand to view the filming locations.

There has been some speculation that Bruce was involved in a real fight on the set of The Big Boss, as depicted in the 1993 biopic Dragon: The Bruce Lee Story. Although no such fight actually took place, Bruce did interact extensively with a few of the Thai stuntmen (one of whom was a former Muay Thai bantamweight champion), and exchanged info and skills with them between takes. Bruce reportedly though seemed unimpressed and called their kicks "telegraphed", while the Hong Kong stunt team (Lam Ching-Ying, Billy Chan and his brother Peter Chan Lung) were initially unimpressed with Bruce, and doubted his abilities. Their opinion of him soon changed when Lam challenged Bruce in the hotel, and Bruce sidekicked him across the room.

After an eventful and at times chaotic first few days' filming in Pak Chong, by early August 1971 the filming had picked up speed, and was progressing well. Bruce and Lo Wei were collaborating, but they still clashed over a few of the scenes, in particular the use of trampolines and mattresses to propel people through the air, and also the scene where Bruce punches a man through a wooden wall, leaving a cartoonish outline in the wood. Bruce was also hesitant to go along with Lo Wei's ideas of filming risqué scenes of his character getting in bed with Thai ladies portraying prostitutes, although he eventually agreed to do them as Lo insisted it would add to his character's newfound image as a revenge-driven warrior.

The final scene filmed in Pak Chong was the climactic fight between Bruce and the boss (played by Han Ying Chieh, who also served as the fight choreographer), which proved to be problematic: Bruce endured "two days of hell" when he sprained his ankle from a high jump on a slipped mattress, and had to be driven to Bangkok to see a doctor, where he caught a virus in the hot and stuffy conditions. Close-ups were used to finish the fight, as Bruce struggled and had to drag his leg, which was covered up with, and contributed to, his character's worn out, exhausted appearance.

The cast and crew spent the last twelve days in August filming further scenes in Bangkok, where Bruce enjoyed breakfast in bed at the Thai Hotel, a luxury he never had in Pak Chong. The dinner party scene was filmed in the back room of the Poonsin Chinese Restaurant, close to the Thai Hotel. A few scenes were filmed at the Chao Phraya River in Phra Pradaeng District, including the opening scene in the film where Bruce and his uncle step off the ferry boat and walk through the busy pier. An old teak house in the east side of Phra Pradaeng district was used as the family home, while Nora Miao's scenes (and part of the opening fight sequence) were filmed on the quieter west side, which resembled rural Pak Chong. At times filming was delayed by heavy rain.

The Big Boss film crew returned to Hong Kong on 3 September, where there would be a further day of filming for insert shots including close-ups of Bruce avoiding the dogs and the "leg-grappling" scene during the fight with the boss (these were filmed at the Royal Hong Kong Golf Club). The final scene filmed was the now deleted "pushcart attack" in the alleyway, at Wader Studio in Hong Kong, as Golden Harvest had not as yet moved into their famous studios on Hammer Hill Road.

Post-production
Bruce viewed over three hours of unedited footage on 5 September, and was pleased with the results. The next day, he flew to the US to see his family and film further episodes of Longstreet. While Bruce was in the US, the footage was sent for processing and editing. The editing was initially done by Golden Harvest editor Sung Ming, but because they were behind schedule, the renowned award-winning editor Chiang Hsing-Lung was also brought in to help. A veteran of over 170 movies, Chiang worked very quickly, and helped deliver the film on time. Since he was employed by Shaw Bros at the time, his involvement was kept secret, and he was uncredited.

Bruce returned to Hong Kong on 16 October with his family plus friend Robert Baker. They were greeted at Kai Tak Airport by several friends, news reporters and a large group of scouts from the Scout Association of Hong Kong. The next day, a private screening was held at Golden Harvest for cinema owners. Sung Ming then made further edits to appease the Hong Kong censors, for the film's general release at the end of October. On 22 October, Bruce and Robert Baker appeared on Enjoy Yourself Tonight to promote the film.

Bruce Lee and JKD short film
While in Thailand, Bruce wrote to Linda regularly, telling her he missed her and the children, and was looking forward to seeing them in Hong Kong once filming had been completed. In return for their air fare (from their home in Los Angeles to Hong Kong), Golden Harvest wanted Bruce to make a short film for them called Bruce Lee and Jeet Kune Do, which would run for approximately 15 minutes and be narrated by actress Nora Miao. According to Hong Kong press reports, Golden Harvest had originally planned for the short film to accompany the release of another upcoming film of theirs called The Hurricane (a.k.a. Gold Cyclone Whirlwind), starring Nora and written and directed by Lo Wei. This would promote Nora and introduce Lee's skills to the Hong Kong public prior to the release of The Big Boss. Nora, who was already in Thailand on vacation, joined the film crew in Bangkok in late August 1971, but the short film was not made, presumably because there was not enough time; she did however film a few brief scenes for The Big Boss in a cameo role as a roadside refreshment vendor.

Release

Box office
On 23 October 1971, the film premiered at the Queen's Theatre in Hong Kong's Central district for a now legendary midnight screening. Linda recalled in her 1975 book Bruce Lee: The Man Only I Knew: "Every dream that Bruce had ever possessed came true that night. The audience rose to its feet, yelling, clapping, cheering. It was almost impossible to leave the theatre; we were absolutely mobbed." The Lees also attended the official gala premiere on 3 November, which was a charity screening for the Scout Association of Hong Kong. The film was an instant success, taking just 3 days to reach , and a week to reach . By the end of its relatively brief run (ending on 18 November), The Big Boss had made , breaking the previous record held by The Sound of Music by more than HK$800,000. An estimated  people in Hong Kong, out of a population of four million, had paid to watch the film. It remained the highest-grossing film of all time in Hong Kong until Lee's second film, Fist of Fury, was released in March 1972.

Shortly after the Hong Kong run, The Big Boss was released in Singapore, and enjoyed similar success there, where it played for a total of 45 days at five theatres. There was chaos at a midnight preview screening (27 November 1971) at Cathay's Jurong Drive-in cinema; police were called as hundreds of cars caused huge jams, and the film had to be delayed for 45 minutes. The film also played to packed cinemas in Malaysia, the third territory to show the film. By September 1972, it had grossed  in the Malaysian capital city of Kuala Lumpur.

Despite the enormous success of The Big Boss in the Far East, overseas distributors were initially reluctant as they didn't think it had potential outside Asia. It was only when the film suddenly became a surprise hit in Beirut (Lebanon) in 1972 that they began to take notice. Suddenly buyers from all over the world were arriving in Hong Kong to buy the film, which was soon opening in new markets for Chinese films such as South America, Africa and southern Europe. The film became a major box office hit in Europe between 1972 and early 1973. In the UK, however, the release of the English-dubbed version was delayed as distributors Crest Films withdrew their application for a BBFC certificate, while they waited for the current storm surrounding film censorship in Britain to pass (the Mandarin version was shown in Chinese cinema clubs in Britain in June 1972).

There was also a delay in the US, as distributors National General Pictures disliked the dubbing, and spent a lot of money on a new soundtrack featuring new music and rewritten, redubbed English dialogue. This new version was eventually released in the US in April 1973 with the title Fists of Fury, about 18 months after the Hong Kong premiere and after Fist of Fury (retitled The Chinese Connection in the US), Lee's second major role, had a limited run in New York. It topped the North American box office in May 1973, above two other Hong Kong martial arts films in the second and third spots, Lady Whirlwind (Deep Thrust) and King Boxer (Five Fingers of Death). Its success was surprising given that the film was only originally intended for the Mandarin circuit. The film earned  in distributor rentals at the American and Canadian box office during its initial run in 1973.

In France, the film became one of the top ten highest-grossing films of 1973, with 2,519,063 ticket sales. In Spain, the film sold 2,211,383 tickets. Upon its October 1973 release in South Korea, the film sold 209,551 tickets in the capital city of Seoul. In Lebanon, the film had a packed six-week first run in Beirut and then a second run that outperformed The Godfather (1972). The UK and Japan were among the last countries to release the film, in April 1974.

Re-releases
When the film was released in the United States, the death of Hsiao Mi, "The Boss", was cut down to him simply being stabbed in the chest with a knife in order to receive an "R" rating. The original version of his death, which not only shows an explicit close-up of the knife in his chest but Cheng Chao-an's fingers piercing his rib cage and blood flowing from under his shirt, would have given the film an "X" rating. The first time this scene was shown in the US was when it played on cable channel AMC in July 2004.

Columbia Pictures released the film as a re-issue in 1978 and again re-issued it with Fist of Fury as a studio sanctioned double feature in February 1981. Miramax distributed The Big Boss on television & streaming (Hulu & Netflix) along with Bruce Lee, the Legend (1984), Game of Death, Way of the Dragon and Fist of Fury.

In the United Kingdom, the film was watched by 300,000 viewers on Channel 5 in 2008, making it the year's most-watched foreign-language film on Channel 5.

On July 14, 2020, The Criterion Collection released a Blu-ray box set featuring The Big Boss, Fist of Fury, The Way of the Dragon, Enter the Dragon, Game of Death, and Game of Death II titled Bruce Lee: His Greatest Hits.

Critical reception
The Big Boss received mixed reviews from critics upon release. From the South China Morning Post during the film's original Hong Kong run: "This is probably the biggest thing to hit the Mandarin film business since the invention of fake blood ... Every cinema showing this film is packed to the fire exits." In a positive review for Singapore newspaper The Straits Times, Arthur Richards wrote, "It is a delightful study of Chinese martial arts mixed with karate and lightning kicks, Western-style ... An acceptable thriller of the James Bond calibre."
Conversely, a negative review by Edgar Koh had appeared in another Singapore newspaper, New Nation, a few days earlier: "Bruce Lee is certainly skilled in his job, not as an actor but as an exponent of his particular brand of fighting with fists and legs ... There are the stereotype good and bad, and the by now redundant theme of revenge. On top of this, it doesn't flow smoothly; the emotional mood, shallow though it is, is sometimes left out on a limb."

Reviews were also mixed when the film was released (as Fists of Fury) in the US in spring 1973. J. Oliver Prescott of the Tampa Bay Times wrote, "Bruce Lee is the fastest foot in the East ... Now back in Hong Kong, he has become the hottest international movie star since Clint Eastwood. Unlike Eastwood’s anti-hero, Bruce Lee is giving the American audiences what they apparently want now: a hero. Lee is Rex Allen, Lash Larue, Tom Mix, Roy Rogers and Gene Autry all rolled into one ... The characters are certainly simple: these are just plain Chinese country folk whose little disagreements develop overnight into Oriental rumbles equivalent to the Sharks and Jets in West Side Story."
Vincent Canby of The New York Times wrote, "Kung fu movies began as a local phenomenon in Hong Kong a couple of years ago. The two I’ve just seen, Fists of Fury (a.k.a. The Big Boss) and Deep Thrust (a.k.a. Lady Whirlwind), make the worst Italian Westerns look like the most solemn and noble achievements of the early Soviet cinema." Variety stated, "Despite the silly plot, dreadful supporting cast and prim morality (or perhaps because of them), Fists of Fury is sometimes entertaining, with most of the credit due to Lee."

On review aggregator Rotten Tomatoes, the film holds a score of 69% based on 16 reviews, with an average rating of 6.1/10.

Alternative versions

Censorship and missing scenes
The Big Boss has quite a long and complicated history of censorship and editing, with many scenes being trimmed or removed completely for various reasons, for different markets. The notorious "handsaw in the split head" shot was cut by the censors in Hong Kong shortly before the film was released there in October 1971. It was only shown in a private screening at Golden Harvest for the press, cinema owners and prospective buyers on 17 October, but has not been seen since; all that survives are a few stills.

Further scenes were cut for the first overseas prints released in some territories in late 1971 and early 1972. The nudity and bloodshed was toned down, along with a few seemingly innocuous scenes, including the final one filmed (in a studio in Hong Kong), where Cheng Chao-An (Bruce Lee) and Hsu Chien (James Tien) are walking home after the fight near the gambling den; they enter a narrow alleyway and have to grab hands and leap onto a wall to avoid a cart which is hurled towards them. The only logical explanation for the cutting of this scene was that it was done to increase the pacing of the early part of the film, which placed more emphasis on James Tien than on Bruce Lee.

There was a reduction to the gruesome sequence in which the body of cousin Ah Wong is cut apart by the electric saw, and body parts are placed into the ice container.

A small edit was made to the dinner party scene, where a drunken Cheng approaches the prostitute Wu Man (played by Malarin Boonak), and imagines her topless.

The scene where Cheng is sitting by the riverside following his discovery of the bodies at the family home, was shortened. When he stands and throws his bundle of belongings into the river, there were then shots of his murdered friends, followed by him angrily shaking his fist and shouting, "Revenge!"

The next cut is another entirely deleted scene, and another popular one alongside of the "saw-in-the-head" scene. After Cheng runs down the road from the creek, rather than cutting to him arriving at the Big Boss's mansion like the mainstream cuts, he returns to the Thai brothel for a third time. Here, he picks up the prostitute in a red sweater-type dress (seen in the background the second time Cheng visits the brothel). Cheng and the prostitute go to her room; Cheng pushes her onto the bed, and the two begin to strip. Cheng stands behind the bed, completely nude, but also completely emotionless. The woman lies on the bed and Cheng walks (waist-high shot) towards the camera, blurring out the scene. Next, Cheng is shown putting on his shirt, while the woman remains in bed. He lays his remaining money on her stomach, even though he already paid to be with her. He then picks up a bag of crisps from the bedside table; he tries one, then leaves. This scene is symbolic and quite important, as in the previous scene Cheng discards his belongings in the river, and here he gives away his money and enjoys his final pleasures and one last meal before either being killed or arrested, a message which is now partially lost. A few seconds of this scene (including a shot of an apparently naked Bruce standing behind the bed) can be seen in the original trailer.

Other missing scenes briefly visible in the same trailer show Hsu Chien re-enacting a fight for his co-workers in the family home; Cheng walking towards the Drinkstand Girl's (Nora Miao) roadside refreshment stall (the camera zooms in to show her smiling at him); a different head visible in the block of ice when Cheng is investigating the ice house; blood pouring from Hsu Chien's head after being stabbed by the boss's son. It is not known if these four scenes were in any print of the film.

Further quick shots of violence – mostly involving weapons such as iron chains, sticks, knives and an ice pick – were cut from the prints in the UK and a few other European countries. These cuts were inexplicably maintained for the "pan and scan" videos released in the 1980s and 1990s but waived for the UK DVD release by Hong Kong Legends in late 2000. Also restored, surprisingly, was the bloodier death scene of the big boss. However, the material cut in 1971 in Hong Kong has never been restored, and remains missing. It was last seen in December 1979 at a Bruce Lee film festival in Kilburn, London, organised by Kung-Fu Monthly poster magazine. The Mandarin print screened for over 1,700 fans came from Golden Harvest's London office, and was complete with the exception of the censored "saw in the head" shot.

An early Mandarin print containing some extra footage is rumoured to still exist, and is thought to be in the hands of a private collector. A DVD was to be released in 2004 called "The Big Boss": "The Version You've Never Seen" but release was cancelled due to copyright issues.

Alternative title confusion

When The Big Boss was being prepared for American distribution, the U.S. release was to be re-titled The Chinese Connection, a play on the popular The French Connection, since both dealt with drug trafficking. The U.S. title of Lee's second film, Fist of Fury, was to be kept nearly the same, except using the plural Fists. However, the titles were accidentally reversed. The Big Boss was released as Fists of Fury and Fist of Fury became The Chinese Connection. Recent American TV showings and the official US DVD release from 20th Century Fox have restored the original titles of all Bruce Lee films, though the descriptions do not match in some cases.

Alternative music scores
Unlike other Lee films, The Big Boss is unique in having not only two, but three completely different music scores. Fist of Fury, Way of the Dragon, Enter the Dragon, and Game of Death all only feature one score with minor alterations.

The first music score for it was composed by Wang Fu-ling, who worked on films such as The Chinese Boxer and One-Armed Swordsman. This was made for the original Mandarin language version, and was also used in the English export version, in addition to the theatrical French and Turkish versions. Wang was the only one to receive credit, but it is also believed composer Chen Yung-yu assisted with the score. At least one cue from Japanese composer Akira Ifukube's scores for the Daimajin trilogy of films was also utilised as stock music.

The second and most widespread of the music scores was by German composer Peter Thomas. This did not become widely known until 2005, when most of the music he composed for the film was published on iTunes. Thomas's involvement stems from a complete reworking of the English version of the film. The early version featured the expatriate voice actors living in Hong Kong who worked on the Shaw Brothers' films, and used Wang Fu-ling's score. It was decided to make a new English version that would stand out from the ones of other martial arts films. New actors were brought in to re-dub the film, and Thomas re-scored the film, abandoning Wang Fu-ling's music. The German dubbed version (German: Die Todesfaust des Cheng Li, English: The Deadly Fist of Cheng Li), premiering before the reworked English version, features his score.

The third score is the 1982 Cantonese release score, which primarily features music from Golden Harvest composer Joseph Koo. However, a good portion of Koo's music in the Cantonese version was originally created in 1974 for the Japanese theatrical release of The Big Boss, which was half Koo's music and half Peter Thomas's. Golden Harvest simply took Koo's music from the Japanese version and added it to the Cantonese version. Aside from this, this version is most infamous for its use of the Pink Floyd music cues from "The Grand Vizier's Garden Party, Part 2", "Time" and "Obscured by Clouds", as well as King Crimson's "Larks' Tongues in Aspic, Part Two". Other music cues were taken from old horror films and B-movies, including I Was A Teenage Werewolf and How To Make A Monster.

Legacy
Kotaku has traced the video game usage of the term "boss" back to The Big Boss.

Brucesploitation sequel
In 1976, an unofficial sequel to The Big Boss was made called The Big Boss Part II, starring Bruce Le (Huang Kin Lung) as Cheng Chao-an and Lo Lieh as Cheng's brother, who wants revenge for their father's murder. The film was directed by Chan Chue, who was an assistant director on the original film and also reprises his role as the villainous ice factory manager. The Big Boss Part II (not to be confused with Big Boss 2 starring Dragon Lee and Bolo Yeung) was partly filmed at some of the Pak Chong locations used in the original film, including the ice factory and the Buddhist temple which is used as the villain's lair. The elusive film still exists, but has never been officially released on home media.

Other actors as Bruce Lee playing Cheng Chao-an
Various Bruce Lee biopics have been filmed over the years, with the two most famous being Bruce Lee: The Man, The Myth and Dragon: The Bruce Lee Story. Both of these films feature their respective actors, Bruce Li and Jason Scott Lee, at one point acting as Lee on the set of The Big Boss. Both films feature a variation of the rumour that Lee was challenged on the set by a Thai boxer. In Myth, Lee was challenged on set and was caught in the middle of an ambush later on off the set. In Dragon, Lee is challenged during an actual take during filming of The Big Boss, wearing the trademark rolled up long sleeve white T-shirt, white sash, and black pants. Both of these are highly exaggerated accounts (not to mention that Dragon makes the mistake of saying that filming for The Big Boss began in July 1970 rather than in July 1971), as the story told is that Lee merely discusses martial arts with a Thai fighter on the set. Besides these two examples, a third Bruce Lee biopic, The Legend of Bruce Lee, this time with Danny Chan Kwok-kwan as Lee and filmed in mini-series form, was shown in Hong Kong in 2008 as part of China's hosting of the summer Olympics. Once again, this biopic shows Lee encountering a Thai boxer on the set of The Big Boss, this time with the challenger being played by martial arts film veteran Mark Dacascos. Photos and behind-the-scenes video of this scene have appeared on various websites, including Dacascos's official site.

Home media

VHS releases
4 Front (United Kingdom)
Released: 17 March 1997
Classification: 18

4 Front (United Kingdom)
Released: 1 October 2001
Part of a boxset
Classification: 18

20th Century Fox (America)
Released: 21 May 2002
Named Fists of Fury
Classification: R, X (known in some video releases)
Color: NTSC
Run time: 99 minutes

DVD releases
Universe (Hong Kong)
Aspect ratio: Widescreen (2:35:1) letterboxed
Sound: Cantonese (Dolby Digital 5.1), Mandarin (Dolby Digital 5.1)
Subtitles: Traditional, Simplified Chinese, English, Japanese, Korean, Indonesian, Malaysian, Thai, Vietnamese
Supplements: Trailer, trailers for Way of the Dragon, Enter the Dragon, Game of Death, Legacy of Rage, star files
All regions, NTSC

Mega Star (Hong Kong)
Aspect ratio: Widescreen (2:29:1)
Sound: Cantonese (Dolby Digital 2.0 Dual Mono), Mandarin (Dolby Digital 2.0 Dual Mono)
Subtitles: Traditional, Simplified Chinese, English, Japanese, Korean
Supplements: Trailer, synopsis, cast and Crew biographies
All regions, NTSC

Fortune Star – Bruce Lee Ultimate DVD Collection (Hong Kong)
Released: 29 April 2004
Aspect ratio: Widescreen (2:35:1) anamorphic
Sound: Cantonese (DTS 5.1), Cantonese (Dolby Digital 5.1), Cantonese (Dolby Digital 2.0 Mono), Mandarin (DTS 5.1), Mandarin (Dolby Digital 5.1)
Subtitles: Traditional, Simplified Chinese, English
Supplements: Original trailer, new trailer, still photos, slideshow of photos, celebrity interviews, unseen footage, Game of Death outtakes, Enter the Dragon alternate opening, 32-page booklet
Region 3, NTSC

Fox (America)
Released: 21 May 2002
Aspect ratio: Widescreen (2:27:1) letterboxed
Sound: English (Dolby Digital 2.0 Mono)
Subtitles: English
Supplements: None
Region 1, NTSC

Fox – Bruce Lee Ultimate Collection (America)
Released: 18 October 2005
Aspect ratio: Widescreen (2:35:1) anamorphic
Sound: Cantonese (Dolby Digital 2.0 Mono), Manadarin (Dolby Digital 2.0 Mono), English (DTS 5.1), English (Dolby Digital 5.1)
Subtitles: English
Supplements: Original trailer, new trailer, still photos, slideshow of photos, interview with Tung Wai, bonus trailers
Region 1, NTSC

Hong Kong Legends – Special Collector's Edition (United Kingdom)
Released: 6 November 2000
Aspect ratio: Widescreen (2:35:1) anamorphic
Sound: Cantonese (Dolby Digital 2.0 Dual Mono), English (Dolby Digital 2.0 Dual Mono)
Subtitles: English, Dutch
Supplements: Commentary by Bey Logan, production photo gallery, animated biography showcase of Bruce Lee with voice over, original Mandarin trailer, Hong Kong promotional trailer, UK promotional trailer, bonus trailers
Region 2, PAL

Hong Kong Legends – Platinum Edition (United Kingdom)
Released: 23 October 2006
Aspect ratio: Widescreen (2:35:1) anamorphic
Sound: Cantonese (Dolby Digital 2.0 Stereo), Cantonese (Dolby Digital 2.0 Dual Mono), English (2.0 Dual Mono)
Subtitles: English, Dutch
Supplements: Disc 1: Commentary by Andrew Staton and Will Johnston, bonus trailers; Disc 2: UK platinum trailer, UK promotional trailer, original Mandarin trailer, Hong Kong promotional trailer, rare uncut 8mm UK trailer, original 35mm UK title sequence, textless 35mm title sequence, original lobby cards, "Paul Weller: Breaking the West", "Fred Weintraub: A Rising Star", "Tom Kuhn: What Might Have Been", "The History of The Big Boss: A Photographic Retrospective", "Deleted Scenes Examined: The Story of the Elusive Original Uncut Print", animated biography showcase of Bruce Lee with voice over, DVD credits
Region 2, PAL

Blu-ray Disc release
Kam & Ronson (Hong Kong)
Released: 6 August 2009
Aspect ratio: Widescreen (2:35:1)
Sound: Cantonese (DTS-HD Master Audio 7.1), Cantonese (Dolby True HD 7.1), Mandarin (Dolby Digital EX 6.1), Thai (Dolby Digital EX 6.1)
Subtitles: Traditional Chinese, English, Thai
Supplements: Tung Wai interview
Region A

Bruce Lee: His Greatest Hits (Criterion Collection #1036)
Disc 1
Released: 14 July 2020
Aspect ratio: Widescreen (2:35:1)
Sound: Original Mandarin Mono, Original English-Dubbed Mono, Cantonese Mono, Mandarin with score by Peter Thomas Mono
Subtitles: English
Supplements: Commentary by Brandon Bentley, Commentary by Mike Leeder, Alternative Footage, Archival Program "Bruce Lee: The Early Years", "Bruce Lee vs Peter Thomas" on Peter Thomas' score, "On The Big Boss" making-of, TV Spots and Trailers, Leaflet shared with accompanying discs of Fist of Fury, The Way of the Dragon, Enter the Dragon, Game of Death and its sequel, alongside the extended "Special Edition" of Enter the Dragon.
Region A

See also

Bruce Lee filmography

References

External links

The Big Boss at the Hong Kong Movie DataBase

A gallery of still shots from The Big Boss
An in-depth article on the missing scenes featuring rare publicity shots and screenshots

1971 films
1971 action films
1970s action thriller films
1971 martial arts films
1970s Cantonese-language films
Films about organized crime
Films about the illegal drug trade
Films directed by Lo Wei
Films set in Thailand
Films set in Bangkok
Films shot in Samut Prakan province
Films shot in Thailand
Golden Harvest films
Hong Kong action films
Hong Kong action thriller films
Hong Kong martial arts films
Hong Kong neo-noir films
Kung fu films
Jeet Kune Do films
Mandarin-language films
Censored films
1970s Hong Kong films